Robert Hayes may refer to:
 Bob Hayes (1942–2002), Olympic gold-medal sprinter and receiver for the Dallas Cowboys
 Robert Hayes (legal scholar) (1942–2011), Australian law scholar
 Robert M. Hayes (information scientist) (born 1926), American academic
 Robert Hayes (seismologist) (1900–1977), New Zealand astronomer, seismologist and organist
 Robert E. Hayes Jr. (born 1947), American bishop of the United Methodist Church
 Robert W. Hayes Jr. (born 1952), Republican member of the South Carolina Senate
 Robin Hayes (Robert Cannon Hayes, born 1945), politician from North Carolina
 Robert Seth Hayes, member of the Black Liberation Army
 Robert H. Hayes, American professor of business administration
 Robert M. Hayes (lawyer) (born 1952)
 Robert Hayes, defensive lineman for the Baltimore Brigade of the Arena Football League
 Robert Hayes (born 1952 or 1953), New York attorney, a founder of the Coalition for the Homeless
 Robert Hayes (serial killer) (born 1982), American serial killer
 Robert Benjamin Hayes, (born 1876), American educator

See also
Robert Hay (disambiguation)
Robert Hays (born 1947), American actor